A list of films produced in Turkey in 1976 (see 1976 in film):

See also
1976 in Turkey

References

Lists of Turkish films
1976